AMEP Parekklisia (Sport Cultural Union Parekklisia) is a Cypriot football club based in Parekklisia, Limassol. The team was playing sometimes in Cypriot Third Division and in Cypriot Fourth Division. In 2006 were merged with ATE-PEK Parekklisias to form Enosis Neon Parekklisia F.C. The team refounded in 2018 after the dissolved of Enosis Neon Parekklisia F.C. in 2017.

References

Football clubs in Cyprus
Association football clubs established in 1961